Kenneth Alfonzo Ellis (born September 27, 1947) is a former American football cornerback who played in the National Football League from 1970 to 1979.

Ellis's football career began at Ralph Johnson Bunche High School in Woodbine, Georgia. He was one of the best high school running backs in the state of Georgia. Ellis then  attended Southern University in Baton Rouge, Louisiana. 

Ellis was selected in the fourth round (93rd pick) in the 1970 NFL Draft by the Green Bay Packers. As a professional, Ellis played cornerback and safety for nine seasons. Speedy and talented, Ellis was chosen to play in the 1973 and 1974 Pro Bowl games. In addition, he was voted All-Pro in 1972 and 1973. He played in Super Bowl XIV as a member of the Los Angeles Rams.  In 1998, he was inducted into the Green Bay Packers Hall of Fame.

References

1947 births
Living people
American football defensive backs
Southern Jaguars football players
Green Bay Packers players
Houston Oilers players
Miami Dolphins players
Cleveland Browns players
Detroit Lions players
Los Angeles Rams players
National Conference Pro Bowl players
Players of American football from Georgia (U.S. state)
People from Camden County, Georgia